Development Impact Bonds (DIBs) are a performance-based investment instrument intended to finance development programmes in low resource countries, which are built off the model of social impact bond (SIB) model. In general, the model works the same: an investor provides upfront funding to the implementer of a program. An evaluator measures the results of the implementer's program. If these results hit a target set before the implementation period, an outcome payer agrees to provide investors a return on their capital. This ensures that investors are not simply engaging in concessionary lending. The first social impact bond was originated by Social Finance UK in 2010, supported by the Rockefeller Foundation, structured to reduce recidivism among inmates from Peterborough Prison.

Based on the SIB model, a DIB creates a contract between private investors and donors or governments who have agreed upon a shared development goal. Investors advance fund development programmes with financial returns linked to verified development goals.

In 2012, Instiglio became the first specialized intermediary founded to adapt development impact bonds and social impact bonds to the unique challenges of low and middle-income countries.

In June 2014, Instiglio, Children's Investment Fund Foundation (CIFF), Educate Girls, IDinsight and UBS Optimus Foundation launched the first Development Impact Bond. The objective of the DIB is to reduce the gender gap in education in Rural India by getting girls into school and learning. UBS is providing an investment to an Indian NGO, Educate Girls. After three years, CIFF (the outcome payer) will pay based on enrollment and learning outcomes that IDinsight will evaluate in three RCTs at Years One, Two, and Three. UBS Optimus Foundation stands to receive their initial investment back plus a return on investment based on the performance of the program. A 2018 review showed that the program resulted in a 52 percent return on investment because of high achievement of the targets.

In 2014, Palladium International (formerly GRM Futures Group) hosted a conference on rapidly expanding the use of DIBs in developing countries.  As of August 2016, Palladium International was in the final stages of launching the Rajasthan Maternal and Newborn Health Impact Bond, with "two international outcome funders and a lead investor [] committed to the Impact Bond." The same study noted that a significant learning was that the high transaction costs can outstrip the cost of the program itself, but that these remain constant regardless of the program size.

The Center for Global Development (CG Dev) hosts a working group and has publications on DIBs. The first work applying DIBs to neglected tropical diseases was led by H2O Venture Partners, supported by DFID and UBS Optimus, to develop case studies for the control of sleeping sickness and rabies.

A related development, pushed by the International Committee for the Red Cross and other partners, is the Humanitarian Impact Bond, designed for financing aid in conflict-affected areas.

See also
 Bond (finance)
 Build America Bonds
 Eurobond
 GDP-linked bond
 Government bond/Sovereign bonds
 Impact Investing
 Patient capital
 Social impact bond

References

Bonds (finance)
Social economy
Social finance